Hemipterochilus is a Palearctic genus of potter wasps. It contains the following species:

 Hemipterochilus aberrans (Moravitz, 1885)
 Hemipterochilus bembeciformis (Morawitz, 1867)
 Hemipterochilus bicoloricornis (Giordani Soika, 1952)
 Hemipterochilus fairmairi (Saussure, 1853)
 Hemipterochilus hohlbecki (Kostylev, 1934)
 Hemipterochilus moricei (Schulthess, 1923)
 Hemipterochilus notula (Lepeletier, 1841)
 Hemipterochilus punctiventris (Moravitz, 1885)
 Hemipterochilus rubrosignatus (André, 1884)
 Hemipterochilus simplex Gusenleitner, 2000

References

 Vecht, J.v.d. & J.M. Carpenter. 1990. A Catalogue of the genera of the Vespidae (Hymenoptera). Zoologische Verhandelingen 260: 3 - 62.

Hymenoptera genera
Potter wasps